Ikar, legally Ikar Airlines LLC and operating as Pegas Fly from 2015 until 2022, is a Russian charter airline headquartered in Orenburg and based at Orenburg Tsentralny Airport, however operating flights from several Russian airports.

History
Initially the company, then operating under the Ikar brand, operated a fleet of Mil Mi-8 helicopters for aerial cargo operations mainly carrying bulky loads externally. 

In 2015, the airline rebranded to become Pegas Fly, although the brand was changed the airlines legal name was kept as Ikar Airlines. As of 2022, the airline was forced to change to another brand name, as the rights to use Pegas Fly have been expired and cannot be renewed. Therefore since 2022, the airline uses its original name Ikar again.

Destinations
Ikar operates scheduled services to the following destinations:

The airline also operates charters on behalf of Pegas Touristik to tourist destinations in Europe, Africa and Asia.

Fleet

The Ikar fleet consists of the following aircraft (as of June 2019):

Accidents and incidents
On 3 December 1995, a Mil Mi-8AMT (RA-25581) leased to Investkorp of Papua New Guinea - pilot error during very poor visibility led to a decrease in rotor speed up to 90 percent at an altitude of just 7 metres as the helicopter continued to descend, understandably at a greater rate. The helicopter crashed; the mechanic was seriously injured.  Investigation revealed that the crew had received insufficient training and it was revealed that those involved were not previously certified to fly the Mil Mi-8AMT; their certificates had been signed in New Guinea under false pretence. It was also revealed that Ikar was only allowed to fly domestic routes and routes in the CIS, their activities in New Guinea had breached this order when they delivered RA-25518 and RA-27003 to New Guinea complete with their staff.
On 11 July 2012, a Mil Mi-8 helicopter was considered 'lost' sparking a scare when connection with the helicopter had failed. Searches were conducted in a forest region in Magadan where the helicopter had been patrolling a forest fire situation. Connection was broken at 3pm (local time) that day with ten firefighters and four crew-members aboard. Another Mil Mi-8 and an Antonov An-26 were dispatched to locate the helicopter which was found safely landed on the ground in the forest, apparently there were connection issues but the helicopter and crew were uninjured.

See also
List of small airlines and helicopter airlines of Russia

References

External links

Airlines of Russia
Airlines established in 1993
Charter airlines
Companies based in Krasnoyarsk